Warming Up may refer to:

 Warming Up (1928 film), American film
 Warming Up (1985 film), Australian film
 Warming Up, an internet blog by British comedian Richard Herring
 Warming Up!, an album by Billy Taylor